Veer is a 2010 Indian Hindi-language epic action film directed by Anil Sharma on a story by Salman Khan. It stars Salman Khan, Mithun Chakraborty, Jackie Shroff, Zareen Khan,Sohail Khan and Rishabh jain

Plot
In 1875, Veer Pratap Singh (Salman Khan) is a Pindari prince and the son of the great Pindari warrior, Prithvi Singh (Mithun Chakraborty), who was known for his great battles to free India from the British rule. Veer wishes to continue his father's legacy by leading a movement of Pindaris against the British in order to free both the Rajasthani Kingdom of Madhavgarh and the rest of India from the great colonial power. Veer receives the help of his younger brother, Punya Singh (Sohail Khan), in gathering an army. However, Veer finds opposition from the King of Madhavgarh, Gyanendra Singh (Jackie Shroff), who sees Veer as a threat to Madhavgarh and his rule and orders for Veer to be killed. Veer and Punya, along with their supporters, go into hiding within the Thar Desert of Rajasthan, while Singh makes an alliance with the British Governor of Rajasthan, James Fraser (Tim James Lawrence), saying that Madhavgarh will support the British in crushing the Pindari movement and eliminating Veer.

To keep the stakes high, the Pindaris kidnap Singh's daughter Princess Yashodhara (Zareen Khan), with who Veer finds himself in love with. The Pindaris then make a failed attempt to take down Singh's palace by surprise. However, Singh's spies discover the plan and thousands of Pindari warriors are slaughtered. Veer fails to get his revenge on the corrupt King, but knows that Punya has been captured by Yashodhara's brother Gajendra (Puru Raaj Kumar). As Veer runs in to save his brother and kill Gajendra's men, Gajendra is killed by Veer. Gyanendra vows to avenge his son. In the meantime, Lady Angela Fraser (Lisa Lazarus), wife of James Fraser, begins to question her husband's actions as he supports the evil king in slaughtering members of the Pindari movement. Fraser refuses to back down from his campaign of crushing the movement.

After Veer promises his father that he will destroy Singh, he gatecrashes Yashodhara's Swayamvara. As he takes the princess away from the fort, Gyanendra Singh sees a vast army of Pindaris surrounding his fort. He asks the British to help him, but they refuse and make the Pindaris their ally in a bid to escape from Madhavgarh. Before the British leave, a battle follows in which Governor Fraser and Gyanendra Singh are killed. Veer, wounded from a gunshot, falls unconscious in the arms of his father. Years later, it is shown that Veer is happily married to Yashodhara. His son (Salman Khan) and Prithvi have a friendly brawl as credits roll.

Cast
 Salman Khan in a dual role as 
Veer Pratap Singh (Fake Kunwar Mahendra Singh)
Veer "Veera" Pratap Singh Jr. (Veer Pratap's son)
 Mithun Chakraborty as Prithvi Singh, Veer's father
 Jackie Shroff as Gyanendra Singh, King of Madhavghar and father of Yashodhara
 Zareen Khan as Princess Yashodhara Singh

 Sohail Khan as Poonam "Punya" Pratap Singh, Veer's brother
 Raj Premi as one of the villains
 Rishabh Jain as Radhurath, Veer's friend
 Puru Raaj Kumar as Gajendra Singh, the prince of Madhavghar, brother to Yashodhara and son to Gyanendra.
 Lisa Lazarus as Lady Angela Fraser, wife of Governor James Fraser
 Tim Lawrence as James Fraser, Governor General of Rajasthan
Karmveer Choudhary as Mantri of Gyanendra Singh
 Khurram Tejrar
 Gita Soto
 Neena Gupta as Mangla Singh, Veer's mother
 Aryan Vaid as Sujan Singh
 Bharat Dabholkar
 Bunny Anand
 Shahbaz Khan as Naunihal
 Ashok Samarth as Mangal
 Militza Radmilovic
 Charissa Glidden as the Governess
 Roy Bronsgeest as Rhino
 Taylor Wright
 Luke Groves
 Fiona Grace as Nina Frances
 Christoph Beiter as English soldier
 Clay Mohr as English Sergeant.
 Raj Khatri as Gyanendra Singh's Senapati.
 Ajay Kalyansingh as Arab prince

Production
The story was written by Salman Khan twenty years ago, who described it as his dream project. At that time, Khan planned to direct the film himself and cast Sanjay Dutt in the lead role. Veer is also partly based on the Russian novel Taras Bulba by Nikolai Gogol. For his role as Veer, Salman Khan went on a special diet and worked out with a personal trainer. For her role as a 19th-century princess, Zarine Khan put on eight kilos of extra weight.

Principal photography for Veer began on 1 December 2008. Portions of the film were originally scheduled to be shot at the College of Engineering and the Agricultural College in Pune, but due to the swine flu outbreak the locations were moved to Mumbai. Other location shooting took place in Jaipur and Bikaner. Location shooting at Amber Fort in Jaipur was also interrupted when several onlookers were injured and the Rajasthan High Court ordered a halt to filming. A case was filed against Anil Sharma accusing the film crew of damaging the fort, violating several conservation laws and causing the structure's 500-year-old roof to collapse. The crew finished their shoot after paying Rs. 2 million in damages.

Rochester Castle appears as a backdrop for a musical sequence named 'Everytime I look into your eyes I see my paradise' featuring a horse and carriage. The Chatham Dockyard provided the setting for many of the montage shots used in the UK dance sequences as well as the location where Veer first meets Yuvraji Yashodhara.

On 23 January 2010, author Pavan Chaudhary filed a Rs. 2 million suit against Khan, Anil Sharma and producer Vijay Kumar Galani, alleging that the film borrowed elements from his novel, Trilogy of Wisdom. The suit called for a halt of the film's screenings.

Release
The trailer of Veer was released on 27 November 2009 at the screening of Priyadarshan's De Dana Dan.

Reception

Critical reception
The movie was generally panned by critics. Taran Adarsh criticized the writing and direction of the movie, describing it as a colossal disappointment. Rajeev Masand of CNN-IBN termed it as "an impossible film to appreciate", criticizing the performance of the support cast, while praising the performance of Salman Khan. Gaurav Malani praised the performance of Salman Khan, while terming the story as average. Noyon Jyoti Parasara of AOL.in also praised Salman Khan but added "Overall, 'Veer' has its pluses but it is sadly restricted to a very average film. It has nothing new and that only makes it seem slower."

Among U.S. critics, Frank Lovece of Film Journal International enjoyed it as "hokum of the highest order, punctuated with the most rousing musical sequences of the last several Indian imports," and after dissecting the film's numerous historical and chronological fallacies said, "Stateside Bollywood fans more accustomed to modern-day musical romances or stylish crime thrillers will be pleasantly surprised to find a period piece that's more Xena: Warrior Princess than A Passage to India.

Box office
According to Eros, Veer grossed Rs 410 million nett in its first week in India.
Veer netted a lifetime of Rs 375.2 million (Rs 497.5 million gross) in India and was the 9th highest-grossing film domestically of 2010.

Veer has a worldwide lifetime gross of Rs 585.8 million ($12,600,000).

Criticism by Rajput community
The Rajput youth organisation Karni Sena was heavily critical of Veer, alleging that portions of the dialogue are "derogatory and demeaning for the Rajput community". Members of the group attacked several multiplexes in Jaipur, vandalising posters and smashing windows. Anil Sharma responded that it was a misunderstanding and no insult had been intended towards the Rajput community.

Awards and nominations
2011 Zee Cine Awards
 Nominated – Best Female Debut – Zarine Khan

3rd Mirchi Music Awards
 Nominated – Lyricist of The Year – Gulzar for "Surili Akhiyon Wale"

Soundtrack

The film's music was released on 17 December 2009. The film's songs are composed by Sajid–Wajid, the film scores were composed by Monty Sharma and the lyrics are written by lyricist Gulzar.

Music critic Joginder Tuteja of Bollywood Hungama gave it an overall rating of 3.5 out of 5. The songs, Surili Akhiyon Wale, Salaam Aaya and Taali received special praise.

See also

List of historical drama films of Asia

References

External links
 
 
 

2010 films
2010s historical action films
2010s Hindi-language films
Indian epic films
Films based on Taras Bulba
Films set in India
Films shot in India
Films shot in London
Films set in the 1820s
2010s historical drama films
Films set in London
Films set in the 19th century
Films shot in Rajasthan
Fiction set in 1825
Indian historical drama films
Indian historical action films
Films directed by Anil Sharma
2010 drama films